Elissa Blair Slotkin (born July 10, 1976) is an American politician serving as the U.S. representative from  since 2019.

Slotkin is a member of the Democratic Party. Prior to her political career, she served as a Central Intelligence Agency (CIA) analyst and Department of Defense official. She is a candidate for the U.S. Senate in the 2024 election to succeed Debbie Stabenow.

Early life and education 
Slotkin was born on July 10, 1976, in New York City, the daughter of Curt Slotkin and Judith (née Spitz) Slotkin. She is Jewish. Slotkin spent her early life on a farm in Holly, Michigan. Her family farm was part of Hygrade Meat Company, founded by her grandfather, Hugo Slotkin. Hygrade is the original company behind Ball Park Franks, a brand now owned by Tyson Foods.

Slotkin earned a Bachelor of Arts in sociology from Cornell University in 1998 and a Master of International Affairs from Columbia University's School of International and Public Affairs in 2003.

Early career 

Slotkin was in New York on September 11, 2001, her second day of classes at Columbia. She cites that experience as the reason she pursued national security. Slotkin was recruited into the Central Intelligence Agency after graduate school. Fluent in Arabic and Swahili, she served three tours in Iraq as a CIA analyst. During the George W. Bush administration, she worked on the Iraq portfolio for the National Security Council. During Barack Obama's presidency, she worked for the State Department and the Department of Defense. Slotkin was acting assistant secretary of defense for international security affairs from 2015 to 2017.

After leaving the Defense Department in January 2017, Slotkin moved back to her family's farm in Holly.

U.S. House of Representatives

Elections

2018 

In July 2017, Slotkin announced her candidacy for Michigan's 8th congressional district. She said she was motivated to challenge two-term Republican incumbent Mike Bishop when she saw him smile at a White House celebration after he and House Republicans voted to repeal the Affordable Care Act. Slotkin's mother was diagnosed with ovarian cancer and died in 2011 after a lifelong struggle to maintain health insurance. On August 7, Slotkin defeated Michigan State University criminal justice professor Christopher Smith in the Democratic primary with 70.7% of the vote. Her campaign knocked on 200,000 doors, sent 300,000 text messages, and made one million phone calls.

In November 2018, Slotkin defeated Bishop with 50.6% of the vote. She is the first Democrat to represent Michigan's 8th district since 2001, when Debbie Stabenow gave up the seat to run for the U. S. Senate.

2020 

Slotkin was reelected in 2020 with 50.9% of the vote, defeating Republican Paul Junge.

In 2019, Slotkin held multiple town halls about her decision to vote in favor of President Donald Trump’s impeachment. The meetings drew hundreds of protestors and received nationwide media coverage. Of this time, Slotkin has said:I think the best thing that ever happened to me is that in my first year as a member of Congress, I came out in favor of impeaching Donald Trump in a Trump-voting district, and every day, for three months, I was asked on camera whether I was going to lose my race, be a one-term congresswoman, is that the end of my short political career. It got me really comfortable with the fact that I might not win. But no one dies, and there has to be something more important than just playing to win every single time.Slotkin adapted to campaigning during the COVID-19 pandemic with virtual and socially distanced campaign events, contactless door canvassing, and running advertisements on gas pumps.

In a viral debate moment, Junge said "undue burdens and regulations" on health insurance companies caused Slotkin's mother to struggle with obtaining health insurance. The video of Slotkin's response, "Please don’t speak about my mother as if you understand what made her health care unaffordable to her", received millions of views.

2022 

Due to redistricting, Slotkin ran for reelection in Michigan's 7th congressional district. In the general election, the most expensive U.S. House race of 2022, she defeated Republican nominee Tom Barrett with 51.5% of the vote to Barrett's 46.5%. It was her largest margin of victory to date.

Slotkin criticized Barrett's stance on abortion, specifically his statement that he is "100% prolife, no exceptions". She also criticized his multiple votes against incentives for a new GM electric vehicle battery plant in Delta Township. During their second debate, Barrett said he did not favor gay marriage.

On November 1, Slotkin hosted "An Evening for Patriotism and Bipartisanship" with Congresswoman Liz Cheney. The event drew a crowd of over 600 and was the first time Cheney had endorsed a Democrat.

Slotkin raised $9.8 million and attributed her victory to "losing better" in the district's Republican-leaning areas. Her win, along with other congressional and state level victories in Michigan, defied national trends that saw Democrats lose control of the U.S. House of Representatives.

Committee assignments 
 Committee on Armed Services
 Subcommittee on Intelligence, Emerging Threats and Capabilities
 Subcommittee on Readiness (vice chair)
 Committee on Homeland Security
 Subcommittee on Counterterrorism and Intelligence (chair)
 Subcommittee on Cybersecurity and Infrastructure Protection
 Committee on Veterans' Affairs
 Subcommittee on Disability Assistance and Memorial Affairs

Caucus memberships 
New Democrat Coalition
Problem Solvers Caucus
 House Pro-Choice Caucus

U.S. Senate candidacy 

On February 27, 2023, Slotkin announced her decision to run for the U.S. Senate seat being vacated by Debbie Stabenow in 2024.

Political positions 
Slotkin has been described as a moderate Democrat. As of January 2023, Slotkin has voted in line with Joe Biden's stated position 100% of the time.

Veterans 
Slotkin was a co-sponsor of the Honoring our PACT Act of 2022, which provided funding for veterans exposed to toxic substances during military service.

Slotkin co-sponsored the Puppies Assisting Wounded Servicemembers (PAWS) for Veterans Therapy Act, which was signed into law in 2021. The bill helps veterans connect with service dogs in their communities.

Health care 
Slotkin supports the Affordable Care Act (Obamacare). During her 2020 campaign, she described the protection of health care coverage for individuals with preexisting conditions as the most important issue for her district. She supports allowing Medicare to negotiate lower drug prices for those insured by Medicare.

During the COVID-19 pandemic in the United States, Slotkin supported the bipartisan CARES Act relief package, which passed Congress in March 2020. In May 2020, she voted for the HEROES Act, a $3trillion stimulus package.

In 2022, Slotkin voted for the Inflation Reduction Act. The bill places a $35 per month out-of-pocket cap on insulin for Medicare recipients and allows Medicare to negotiate prescription drug prices.

Gun policy
In 2022, Slotkin voted for H.R. 1808: Assault Weapons Ban of 2022.

In 2022, Slotkin introduced H.R. 6370: Safe Guns, Safe Kids Act to require secure firearm storage in the presence of children. It was introduced after the shooting at Oxford High School. It was passed by the House as part of the Protecting Our Kids Act of 2022.

Abortion 
Slotkin supports legal access to abortion. During her 2022 reelection campaign, she criticized her opponent, Tom Barrett, for stating he was "100% pro-life, no exceptions", a position she said did not align with the people in her district.

Campaign finance reform 
In 2022, Slotkin signed onto the Ban Corporate PACs Act, which if enacted would prevent corporations from operating a political action committee.

COVID-19 policy 

On January 31, 2023, Slotkin voted against H.R.497:Freedom for Health Care Workers Act, a bill which would lift COVID-19 vaccine mandates for healthcare workers.

On February 1, 2023, Slotkin voted against a resolution to end the COVID-19 national emergency.

Economy 
Slotkin's district contains two GM auto plants, and she works closely with the UAW. She supports the new GM manufacturing facility in Lansing, which is to be operational in 2024. Slotkin has been a vocal proponent of countering China's role in the world, and has supported strategic economic competition with the Chinese government.

Slotkin co-sponsored the CHIPS Act, legislation to address the semiconductor shortage and boost U.S. production.

In 2022, Slotkin's Strengthening America’s Strategic National Stockpile Act passed the House of Representatives. The bill was in response to supply chain shortages exacerbated by the COVID-19 pandemic and is designed to update the Strategic National Stockpile (SNS) by increasing domestic production of critical medical supplies.

Environment 
Provisions Slotkin introduced to require the reporting of PFAS contamination test results were included in the 2021 National Defense Authorization Act (NDAA).

Impeachment 
In September 2019, Slotkin and six other freshman House Democrats authored an opinion piece in The Washington Post calling for an impeachment inquiry into President Donald Trump. Its publication led to widespread Democratic support for an impeachment inquiry. Slotkin voted for Trump's first and second impeachments.

Foreign policy 

Slotkin was the main sponsor of the 2020 Iran War Powers Resolution, which passed, 224–194.

Slotkin voted against H.Con.Res. 21 which directed President Joe Biden to remove U.S. troops from Syria within 180 days.

Electoral history

Personal life 
Slotkin married Dave Moore, a retired Army colonel and Apache helicopter pilot. They met in Baghdad during the Iraq War and resided in Holly. The two filed for divorce in 2023. Slotkin has two stepdaughters, one an Army officer and the other a physician.

See also
List of Jewish members of the United States Congress
List of Jewish American politicians
Women in the United States House of Representatives

References 
Specific

General

External links 

 Congresswoman Elissa Slotkin official U.S. House website
 Elissa Slotkin for Senate campaign website

|-

|-

1976 births
American civil servants
American Jews from Michigan
Jewish American people in Michigan politics
Cornell University alumni
School of International and Public Affairs, Columbia University alumni
Democratic Party members of the United States House of Representatives from Michigan
Female members of the United States House of Representatives
Jewish members of the United States House of Representatives
Jewish women politicians
Living people
People from Holly, Michigan
People of the Central Intelligence Agency
United States Department of Defense officials
21st-century American Jews
21st-century American women